"Fragments of Time" is a song by electronic music duo Daft Punk, featuring vocals and co-production by Todd Edwards. It is included in the duo's 2013 album Random Access Memories. "Fragments of Time" charted in France and the United States due to digital downloads of the album.

Background

Edwards had previously collaborated with Daft Punk to create the song "Face to Face" on the 2001 album Discovery. When he visited the sessions of Random Access Memories in California, the duo were seeking a "west coast vibe" for the album. At the studio, Edwards was asked to implement his signature "cut-up" method of music production for a portion of "Fragments of Time", which ultimately served as the chorus section. Edwards initially thought his production section would be used as an eight-bar break rather than the chorus. Daft Punk was especially thankful to Edwards for his cut-up effects, as the duo felt the song had been lacking in electronic elements. Edwards also recalled that the microphone he sang on for his contribution to the album is "more than my car is worth" and had previously been used by Frank Sinatra.

Much like the rest of the album, "Fragments of Time" makes use of session musicians for most of the instrumentation. Paul Jackson, Jr. played rhythm guitar for the song as Chris Caswell and Daft Punk were responsible for the keyboards. Nathan East and James Genus performed on bass while Omar Hakim played drums and Quinn provided percussion. In addition to the lead synthesizer played by Daft Punk, the song includes pedal steel guitar work by Greg Leisz. Daft Punk sought to use the pedal steel in a way that bordered between electronic and acoustic.

Composition
"Fragments of Time" is performed in common time and at a tempo of 132 beats per minute. It is in the key of C Major, and the vocal ranges from G4 to A5. Edwards commented that the lyrics were inspired by his desire to capture the moments he experienced during his visit to the duo's studio sessions in California; in particular he desired to stay in the area and to reminisce. More specifically he sings about "the gold and the silver dream", and creating "these random memories". William Goodman of Fuse wrote that "Fragments of Time" is "a total Hall & Oates nod and it's on a road to paradise". Ryan Schreiber of Pitchfork compared the song to the "80s country pop" of Sheena Easton.

Personnel
 Daft Punk – synthesizers, keyboards, production, songwriting
 Todd Edwards – vocals, co-production, songwriting
 Paul Jackson Jr – guitar 
 Chris Caswell – keyboards 
 Nathan East – bass
 James Genus – bass
 Omar Hakim – drums
 Quinn – percussion

Chart positions

References

Daft Punk songs
Todd Edwards songs
2013 songs
Songs written by Thomas Bangalter
Songs written by Guy-Manuel de Homem-Christo